ISO 639:kfo
Kanojo ga Flag o Oraretara
Killybegs Fishermen's Organisation (one of the three which form the Federation of Irish Fishermen)
Knight of the Royal Order of Francis I
Kukla, Fran and Ollie
Royal Stockholm Philharmonic Orchestra
Kfo, Korean League of Legends player